Athmuqam or Athmakam is a Tehsil about 73 kilometres from Muzaffarabad, in Azad Kashmir.  It is the headquarters of Neelum District.  Its population was 7,922 in 2017.

The town is accessible by Neelum road from Muzaffarabad. All the basic necessities of life are available there. There is a market and post office. Banks, hospital and telephone exchanges are also present. A number of guest Houses for accommodating visitors and Tourists.

University of AJK Neelum campus is also located in the town having departments of Computer Science, Geology and English. There are two degree colleges 1 for Girls & 1 for Boys. Private colleges like Neelum Institute of Science & Humanities (NISH) & Schools like Owasia Educational Academy are providing quality education.

Office of the Deputy commissioner & Assistant Commissioner, Superintendent of Police etc. are present.
DHQ, NADRA, and Post Office is there

See also
Kundal Shahi
Dosut
Kutton
Keran
Sharda
Kel
Dowarian

Notes

References

Sources

External links
 NEELUM VALLEY JEWAL OF AZAD KASHMIR
 Tour guide photo gallery maps of Azad Kashmir

Populated places in Neelam District
Tehsils of Neelam Valley District